"A Forever Kind of Love" is a song written by Gerry Goffin and Jack Keller and recorded by Bobby Vee.  Bobby recorded 2 different versions of the song, the first at Abbey Rd in the UK in February 1962 with backing vocals by the Mike Sammes Singers.  That version was produced by Snuff Garrett and arranged by Norrie Paramor and released as a single only in the UK and Australia.  It reached #13 in the United Kingdom in 1962.  On return to the US, Vee recorded another version of the song on March 27, 1962 at the same session as "Sharing You" at United Recording Studios in LA.  It was produced by Snuff Garrett and arranged by Ernie Freeman, however the new recording lacked the sparkle of the earlier UK version and was issued only on his 1962 album, A Bobby Vee Recording Session.

The song was produced by Snuff Garrett and arranged by Norrie Paramor.

Other versions
Cliff Richard and the Shadows released a version on an EP in September 1964 in the United Kingdom.

References

1962 songs
1962 singles
Songs with lyrics by Gerry Goffin
Songs written by Jack Keller (songwriter)
Bobby Vee songs
Cliff Richard songs
Song recordings produced by Snuff Garrett
Liberty Records singles